Patient X is a 2009 Filipino horror film directed by Filipino director Yam Laranas, and stars Richard Gutierrez and Cristine Reyes. It is co-produced by GMA Pictures, Viva Films, and RGUTZ Productions. This is the first movie of Richard Gutierrez which he served as co-producer under Viva Films Productions and GMA Films.

Synopsis
After twenty years, local police capture the murderer of the older brother of a young boy. Now a doctor, he must go back to his old town and face the murderers himself. He then discovers that the murderers are Aswangs (folkloric Filipino vampire-like creatures) and they pose a deadly threat not only to him but also for the entire town.

Cast

Main cast
Richard Gutierrez as Dr. Lukas Esguerra
Cristine Reyes as Guada

Supporting cast
TJ Trinidad as Alfred
Miriam Quiambao as Nurse Betty 
Nanding Josef as Dr. Jack
Elvis Guiterrez as Marcus
Dion Ignacio as Samuel
Barbie Forteza as Sonia 
Paulo Avelino as Robert
Crispin Pineda as Mateo
Junyka Santarin as Mia
Jake Vargas as James
Che Ramos as Melinda

Release
Eleven Arts has bought the rights for the international sales duties for Patient X from both GMA Films and Viva Films. The film was released in the Philippines on October 28, 2009.

Reception
Derek Elley of Film Business Asia gave the film a rating of three out of 10 stating that "The film desperately needed a professional action director, and a proper horror score, to give it some pace."
The final gross of the movie is  according to Box Office Mojo.

See also
List of ghost films

References

External links

GMA Pictures films
Viva Films films
2009 films
2009 horror films
Filipino-language films
Films set in the 2010s
Philippine horror films
2000s Tagalog-language films
Vampires in film
2000s English-language films
Films directed by Yam Laranas